Aviis Zhong (born 30 July 1986) is a Taiwanese actress. She is best known for her leading roles in the dramas Iron Ladies and The Wonder Woman.

Career
In 2004, Zhong started out in the industry as a model and appeared in several music videos for artists such as Sandee Chan and S.H.E. In 2007, she received her first acting role in the movie Secret. She then went on to have supporting roles in several dramas such as Gloomy Salad Days, Wake Up 2 and Mr. Right Wanted. Zhong received her first leading role in drama Iron Ladies. She then continued to have leading roles in dramas Five Missions, Code 2 and The Wonder Woman.

Zhong was nominated for Best Actress in a Miniseries or Television Film at the 53rd Golden Bell Awards, for the television film, The Substitute.

Personal life
Zhong graduated from Shih Chien University. A polyglot, she is able to speak four languages: English, Japanese, French and Mandarin Chinese. Zhong is a practising Catholic.

Zhong was in a relationship with White Ant'' co-star Chris Wu from 2015 to 2017.

Filmography

Television

Film

Miniseries

Microfilm

Variety show

Music video appearances

Theater

Awards and nominations

References

External links

1986 births
21st-century Taiwanese actresses
Taiwanese television actresses
Taiwanese film actresses
Taiwanese female models
Actresses from Taipei
Living people